Ozernoye (Köl-Ĵik) is a rural locality (a selo) in Manzherokskoye Rural Settlement of Mayminsky District, the Altai Republic, Russia. The population was 167 as of 2016. There are 36 streets.

Geography 
Ozernoye is located 34 km south of Mayma (the district's administrative centre) by road. Manzherok is the nearest rural locality.

References 

Rural localities in Mayminsky District